This is a list of football (soccer) stadiums in Angola, ranked in descending order of capacity with at least 5,000 Spectators. Some stadiums are football-specific and some are used for other purposes.

Existing stadiums

See also 
List of association football stadiums by capacity
List of African stadiums by capacity

References 

 
Angola
Football in Angola
Football stadiums